Marian, Again is a two-part British psychological thriller serial, written by Ben Court and Caroline Ip and directed by David Drury, that broadcast across two consecutive nights on ITV from 5 September 2005. Filmed in and around Manchester and on Ballaugh and Douglas on the Isle of Man during May and June 2005, the serial is based upon the real-life kidnapping of Colleen Stan in the United States.

Also taking inspiration from the cases of Marc Dutroux and Natascha Kampusch, Marian, Again follows married father of three Chris Bevan (Stephen Tompkinson), who whilst taking his daughter to school exam, seemingly catches sight of his first girlfriend, Marian Walsh (Kelly Harrison), who mysteriously disappeared fifteen years ago and has not been seen or heard from since.

Marian, Again broadcast over two consecutive nights, with parts one and two attracting 6.76 million and 5.95 million viewers respectively. The serial was released on DVD in Denmark on 13 September 2006, but this remains the only official release worldwide.

Reception
Mark Cunliffe for Letterboxd, who viewed the serial in 2015, wrote; "This is a gripping psychological chiller. Marian, Again may look a teensy bit dated in terms of today's TV movies - it's often drowned by an unnecessary score - a common complaint with TV from this period - but it remains a deeply absorbing and uncomfortable watch. Be warned though, its content may not be for everyone."

Plot
Chris Bevan (Stephen Tompkinson) encounters his first love, Marian Walsh (Kelly Harrison), fifteen years after her abrupt disappearance. Although he had accepted her loss and moved on, he—now a married father of three daughters—is intrigued, confused, and eager to know why she suddenly left. What he doesn't know is that she was abducted by Bernie (Owen Teale), a creepy regular at her father's D.I.Y. store. After years of physical and mental torture at Bernie's hands, Marian is a shadow of her former self and has been convinced by Bernie that she's someone named Susie. Chris must now fight to save the woman he loved, but it's more difficult than he had anticipated.

Cast
 Stephen Tompkinson as Chris Bevan
 Kelly Harrison as Marian Walsh
 Owen Teale as Bernie Sullivan
 Samantha Beckinsale as Josie Bevan
 Paul Copley as Philip Walsh
 Katie Ross as Olivia Bevan
 Grace Cassidy as Esme Bevan
 Amy Lythgoe as Tilly Bevan
 Jack Harrison-Cooper as Brandon Brison
 Stuart McQuarrie as Jim 
 Natalie Richards as Frances
 Junaid Iqbal-Wahid as Sonny
 Shahed Ali as Suraj
 Sian Gibson as Fiona 
 Patrick Connolly as PC Quinn
 Peter Slater as PC Sanders

References

External links
 
 Official website

2005 films
2005 television films
2005 psychological thriller films
British thriller television films
British psychological thriller films
Films directed by David Drury
2000s English-language films
2000s British films